Lampropeltis webbi is a species of king snake in the family Colubridae. The species is endemic to Mexico. Currently, there are only five known specimens, with one being a live snake.

Etymology
The specific name, webbi, is in honor of American herpetologist Robert G. Webb.

Description
Due to the few number of specimens, there is limited knowledge of the range of L. webbi appearances. Known specimens have a pattern of grey with broad red saddles bordered by black striping. The largest specimen has a length of 75 cm, with specimens having a ventral scale count ranging 216-221 ventral scales. The head is slightly distinct from the neck, with brown eyes slightly protruding from the head.

Habitat and geographic range
Lampropeltis webbi has been found in rugged montane pine–oak forest in the Sierra Madre Occidental, near the border between the Mexican states of Durango and Sinaloa. It has been found only on a small stretch of a single highway in this region, with most of the specimens being found dead on the road.

Reproduction
L. webbi is oviparous.

References

Further reading
Bryson RW, Dixon JR, Lazcano D (2005). "New Species of Lampropeltis (Serpentes: Colubridae) from the Sierra Madre Occidental, México". Journal of Herpetology 39 (2): 207–214. (Lampropeltis webbi, new species).
Hansen RW, Salmon GT (2017). "Distribution analysis, taxonomic updates, and conservation status for the Lampropeltis mexicana group (Serpentes: Colubridae)". Mesoamerican Herpetology 4 (4): 700–758. (Lampropeltis webbi, pp. 720–721, 741–742 + Figures 15–18, 30).

webbi
Endemic reptiles of Mexico
Fauna of the Sierra Madre Occidental
Reptiles described in 2005